Hopkins is a seven-part documentary TV series set at the Johns Hopkins Hospital, a teaching hospital in Baltimore, Maryland (US). It premiered in the United States on June 26, 2008, on ABC and is currently airing in syndication on the We TV Network. The theme for the show "So Much to Say" was written by songwriter Matthew Puckett. The series won a Peabody Award in 2009.

Created as a real-life adjunct to the ABC medical drama Grey's Anatomy, it follows the professional lives of hospital caregivers and their patients. The show is a follow-up to the ABC documentary series Hopkins 24/7, from 2000.  Boston Med, which aired on ABC in June–August 2010, was produced by the same team behind Hopkins.

Controversy
The fourth episode of the series featured a young boy with a serious, irreversible heart condition. His heart was barely functioning at a level high enough to keep him alive, and he went into cardiac arrest during a heart biopsy. During a discussion among the boy's doctors about the course of treatment, Dr. James Fackler, a pediatric critical care specialist, was shown saying, "It's my opinion that we should just let the child die." This comment incited controversy among viewers, who considered it insensitive.

In a video on ABC's Hopkins website, Dr. Fackler elaborated on what he meant, explaining that if the boy required a heart transplant, mechanical life support (ECMO) would not keep him alive long enough for a new heart to become available.

The series failed to show the importance of hospital positions other than the main physician. Nurses felt their jobs were undermined because of how doctors were portrayed as lone heroes.  Nurses, social workers and clergy were some of the many people who contributed to the doctor's success.

Footnotes

External links
 Hopkins at Johns Hopkins Hospital
 Official Website - hopkins.abcnews.com
 "A Doctor in the Making": Interview of Dr. Herman Bagga from ABC's Hopkins, by Ranjit Souri in India Currents magazine
 

American Broadcasting Company original programming
2000s American television miniseries
Johns Hopkins Hospital
2000s American documentary television series
2000s American medical television series
2008 American television series debuts
2008 American television series endings
Television shows set in Baltimore
Television shows filmed in Maryland